Lenartovce is a village and municipality in the Rimavská Sobota District of the Banská Bystrica Region of southern Slovakia. It has 546 inhabitants.

External links
https://web.archive.org/web/20080111223415/http://www.statistics.sk/mosmis/eng/run.html
http://www.lenartovce.sk/

Villages and municipalities in Rimavská Sobota District